Georgia elected its members October 5, 1818.

See also 
 1819 Georgia's at-large congressional district special election
 1818 and 1819 United States House of Representatives elections
 List of United States representatives from Georgia

1818
Georgia
United States House of Representatives